Matthew or Matt Rowe may refer to: 
 Matthew Rowe (cyclist)
 Matthew Rowe (speed skater)
 Matt Rowe (songwriter)